The 1987–88 season was Stoke City's 81st season in the Football League and 28th in the Second Division.

After the previous season's decent performance there was great optimism ahead for Mick Mills' third season in charge. However it turned out to be a frustrating season with Stoke unable to maintain a good run of form and they unsurprisingly finished in mid-table in a season of little progress.

Season review

League
Mick Mills now entering into his third season as City boss had the support of the fans following last season's improvement and for the third season running the club played in the Isle of Man Trophy, with Stoke beating Dundee in the final. This created great optimism amongst supporters that they would enjoy a good league campaign. However that quickly vanished on the opening day of the season as Birmingham City scored the first goal after just 45 seconds. This seemed to set the tone for a frustrating season. The team made a poor start winning just three of their first nine matches and it always looked too much for them to recover from. When Stoke did hit a run of form in January injury prevented any meaningful attempt to mount a push for a play-off place and the side made no progress and finished in 11th place.

Lee Dixon was sold to Arsenal in January for £375,000 a good price for a full back in 1988 and with Steve Bould's contract running out he also joined the "Gunners" for a fee of £390,000 which was settled at a tribunal.

FA Cup
Stoke drew First Division side Liverpool in the third round and produced two excellent performances. In the first game at Stoke almost 32,000 saw a goalless draw which Stoke should have won but Graham Shaw missed an easy chance. In the replay a battling Stoke lost by a goal to nil.

League Cup
In the League Cup Stoke beat Gillingham and Norwich City, but then lost in the next round to Arsenal.

Full Members' Cup
Stoke had their best run in the Full Members' Cup beating Portsmouth, Sheffield Wednesday and Leicester City before losing to eventual runner-up Luton Town in the quarter final.

Final league table

Results

Legend

Football League Second Division

FA Cup

League Cup

Full Members' Cup

Isle of Man Trophy

Friendlies

Squad statistics

References

Stoke City F.C. seasons
Stoke